The 2010–11 Duke Blue Devils men's basketball team represented Duke University in the 2010–11 NCAA Division I men's basketball season. Returning as head coach was Hall of Famer Mike Krzyzewski. The team played its home games at Cameron Indoor Stadium in Durham, North Carolina and are members of the Atlantic Coast Conference.  The team finished the regular season with a record of 30–4, ranked #1 in the media polls a total of eleven weeks during the season.  They also won the ACC tournament, winning for the third consecutive year. As the #1 seed in the west region of the 2011 NCAA Division I men's basketball tournament, they defeated Hampton in the second round and Michigan in the third round to advance to the Sweet Sixteen where they were defeated by Arizona to finish the season 32–5.

Previous season
The team finished 2010 with a 35–5 record, becoming the ACC Regular Season Co-Champion, ACC tournament champion, and earning a #1 seed in the 2010 NCAA Division I men's basketball tournament. The Blue Devils beat Butler in the championship game 61–59 to win the fourth national championship in school history.

Pre-season

Recruiting

Roster

Schedule

|-
!colspan=9 style=| Exhibition

|-
!colspan=9 style=| Regular Season

|-
!colspan=12 style=| ACC Tournament

|-
!colspan=12 style=| NCAA tournament

Game Notes – NCAA tournament

Second round: Hampton

Duke opened the 2011 NCAA Tournament with a match up against #16 seed Hampton.  Duke came out and took care of business with a commanding 39–22 lead going into halftime.  As the game continued, Duke built a larger margin and easily took the first game of the tournament, beating Hampton 87–45.  After Kyrie Irving suffered a toe injury in December and missed 26 games, he made his return against Hampton.  After a slow start, Irving led the team in scoring with 14 points while playing 20 minutes.

Third round: Michigan

Duke continued their 2011 NCAA Tournament bid with a third-round match up with the Michigan Wolverines.  Duke opened the game going back and forth with Michigan, going into halftime with a 38–33 lead.  However, even after leading by 15 points midway through the second half, the Wolverines would not go away.  Bringing the game down to the final seconds, it was Duke who prevailed behind Nolan Smith's 24 and beat Michigan 73–71 moving them on to the Sweet Sixteen in Anaheim.  This victory also gave coach Mike Krzyzewski his 900th career victory, becoming only the fourth coach to accomplish this feat.

Regional semifinal: Arizona

Duke played well in the first half and was up by 6 points at halftime. Arizona was only kept within range by a stellar performance by Wildcats forward Derrick Williams, who scored 25 of his 32 points in the first half. In the second half, Williams' teammates came alive as Arizona went on a 19–2 run from which Duke was unable to recover.

Rankings

References

Duke
Duke Blue Devils men's basketball seasons
Duke
Duke Blue Devils men's basketball team
Duke Blue Devils men's basketball team